David William Dye FRS (30 December 1887 – 18 February 1932) was an English physicist.

He was born the third son of Alderman Charles Dye, who was the Mayor of Portsmouth in 1906. After attending the local Technical College in Portsmouth he studied for a B.Sc at London University. He then served an apprenticeship at the British Thomson-Houston Company at Rugby before joining the National Physical Laboratory in 1910, where he was appointed Head of the Electrical Standards and Measurements Section in 1919.

He developed techniques for the use of tuning forks as a precision timing standard when maintained in continuous vibration, which provided a very accurate national standard wavemeter. The work led to the development of a standard clock accurate to one part in a million, a huge improvement over existing methods of measurement which were accurate to only one part in a thousand. He eventually turned to the piezo-electrical crystal to develop the first quartz clock. Louis Essen joined Dye's research group at the National Physical Laboratory in 1929 and went on to develop practical clocks after Dye's death.
 
By 1927 he had moved on to develop a magnetometer capable of measuring the vertical element of the earth's magnetic field, which was so accurate that it was incorporated into the Abinger Magnetic Observatory.

In 1928 he was elected a Fellow of the Royal Society. His application citation stated that he

Bibliography

References

1887 births
1932 deaths
English physicists
Fellows of the Royal Society
Scientists of the National Physical Laboratory (United Kingdom)